Feather Linux, created by Robert Sullivan, was a Knoppix-based operating system which fits in under 128 MB (while older versions were made to fit within 64 MB). It boots from either a CD or a USB flash drive, into a Fluxbox desktop environment. It has a wide range of desktop and rescue software, and can load entirely into RAM (if enough RAM is available) or be installed to a hard drive. Feather Linux contains GTK+ applications, such as AbiWord and Pidgin. Feather Linux has tried to include software that people would frequently be using on their desktop.

It is only available on the x86 architecture. It can run on a 486 or higher, and requires 16MB RAM to run on the console, and 24MB RAM to run the X server.

According to DistroWatch, Feather Linux is discontinued and its final release was on 2005-07-04.  The Feather Linux home page is no longer available.

Feather Linux and Damn Small Linux share some common goals.

See also 

Comparison of Linux distributions
Lightweight Linux distribution

References

External links
Former official website, now unavailable

Feather Linux archive and downloads

Knoppix
Light-weight Linux distributions
Discontinued Linux distributions
Live USB
Linux distributions